Qayen (also Romanized as Ghayen, Qaen or Ghaen; from  Kāyēn) is a city in and the capital of Qaen County, in South Khorasan Province, Iran. The population at the 2006 census, was 32,474 in 8,492 families.

History
The Middle Persian work Shahrestaniha i Eranshahr mentions this city, and attributes its foundation to Sined Ninoh Kitop in 1588.

See also

Bihud, South Khorasan

References

Populated places in Qaen County
Populated places established in the 15th century